Minuscule 582 (in the Gregory-Aland numbering), δ 410 (von Soden), is a Greek minuscule manuscript of the Greek Bible of the Old Testament and New Testament, on paper. Dated by a colophon to the year 1334. The manuscript has complex contents. It was labelled by Scrivener as 451.

Description 

The codex contains the entire of the New Testament on 114 paper leaves (size ). It is written in one column per page, 39 lines per page.

The order of books: Gospels, Pauline epistles, Acts of the Apostles, Catholic epistles, and Apocalypse.

The manuscript contains also the Old Testament, according to Septuaginta on 1-3 volumes. The text of the New Testament is included to 4th volume.

Text 

The Greek text of the codex is a mixture of text-types with a predominate the Byzantine element. Aland did not place it in any Category.
According to Claremont Profile Method it represents the textual family Π200 in Luke 1 and Πb Luke 20. In Luke 10 its text is illegible, in result no profile was made.

History 

The manuscript was written by Nicodemus. It was examined by Dean Burgon. It was added to the list of New Testament manuscripts by Frederick Henry Ambrose Scrivener. The text of the Apocalypse was collated by Herman C. Hoskier and edited by him in 1929.

The manuscript currently housed in at the Biblioteca Comunale Ariostea (CI. II, 187, III), at Ferrara.

See also 

 List of New Testament minuscules
 Biblical manuscript
 Textual criticism

References

Further reading 
 Herman C. Hoskier, Concerning the Text of the Apocalypse (London 1929), vol. 1, p. 308-313 (only of Revelation)

Greek New Testament minuscules
Septuagint manuscripts
14th-century biblical manuscripts